The 2016–17 season of the Primera División Sala is played by 16 teams.

Teams

References

2016–17 in Spanish futsal